Charles Reef is a small rocky shoal about half a mile (0.8 kilometers) south and west of Madison Reef, off the coast of Madison in New Haven County, Connecticut. It is between 7 and 18 feet deep and surrounded by deeper waters. A buoy marks the location.

See also
Round Rock, Madison
Tuxis Island
Gull Rock, Madison
Thimble Islands
Madison Reef
Outer Lands

References

Landforms of New Haven County, Connecticut
Long Island Sound
Shoals of the United States
Madison, Connecticut